Paolo Renier (21 November 1710 – 13 February 1789) was a Venetian statesman, the 119th and penultimate Doge of Venice.  He was a noted orator, and served as ambassador to the Ottoman Empire and to Austria.  His election as Doge was unpopular, and he was the subject of numerous menacing letters at the time.  Renier was succeeded as Doge by Ludovico Manin, who would be the last Doge of Venice. He married Giustina Donà (d. 1751) in 1733, and Margherita Delmaz (d. 1817) in 1751.

References

 

Ambassadors of the Republic of Venice to Austria
1710 births
1789 deaths
Baili of Constantinople
18th-century diplomats
18th-century Italian people
18th-century Doges of Venice
Ambassadors of the Republic of Venice to the Ottoman Empire